Football Club Okzhetpes (Oqjetpes Kókshetaý Fýtbol Klýby) is a Kazakhstani professional football based in the Torpedo Stadium in Kokshetau. The club currently plays in the Kazakhstan Premier League.

History
Although having finished only 9th in the 2008 Kazakhstan Premier League, the club gained entry to the first qualifying round of the inaugural season of the UEFA Europa League because of the denial of licenses by UEFA and withdrawal of higher placed teams.

On 3 January 2019, Andrei Karpovich was announced as Okzhetpes manager for the 2019 Kazakhstan Premier League season.

Names
 1957 : Founded as Torpedo
 1990 : Renamed Spartak
 1991 : Renamed Kokshetau
 1994 : Renamed Kokshe
 1997 : Renamed Avtomobilist and moved to Shortandy (Nur-Sultan suburb)
 1998 : Renamed Khimik and moved to Stepnogorsk
 1999 : Renamed Akmola
 2000 : Moved back to Kokshetau
 2001 : Renamed Esil
 2004 : Renamed Okzhetpes

Should not be mistaken with the defunct club FC Azhar also based in Kokshetau

Origin of name
The club takes its name from a cliff, Okzhetpes, which means 'an arrow won't reach'. According to fan club president Viktor Kruk: "Eighteenth century Kazakh ruler Ablai Khan could not decide which of his warriors to give a captive girl to and so allowed her to choose a husband for herself. She climbed to the top of the highest cliff and said she would marry whoever hit her shawl with an arrow. Nobody managed it."

Domestic history

Continental history

Notes
 1Q: First qualifying round
 2Q: Second qualifying round
 3Q: Third qualifying round
 PO: Play-off round

Current squad

Managers
 Syarhyey Hyerasimets (2006), (2009–10)
 Vladimir Cheburin (January 2011 – December 2011)
 Viktor Dohadailo (December 2011 – March 2012)
 Viktor Semenov (interim) (March 2012– May 2012)
 Vladimir Cheburin (May 2012 – Feb 2013)
 Vladimir Mukhanov (December 2014 – May 2017)
 Viktor Semenov (interim) (May 2017– May 2017)
 Viktor Pasulko (May 2017 – September 2017)
 Sergey Popkov (December 2017 – December 2017)
 Andrei Karpovich (January 2019 –December 2020)
 Sergei Popkov (January 2021 – )

External links
 Official website

References

 
Sport in Kokshetau
Football clubs in Kokshetau
Okzhetpes, FC
Association football clubs established in 1957
1957 establishments in the Kazakh Soviet Socialist Republic
Akmola Region
Kokchetav Oblast